The 1997 Minnesota Twins will not be remembered as the strongest team the Twins ever fielded.  Manager Tom Kelly's team consisted of a few solid players, but mainly past-their-prime veterans and never-to-be-established prospects.  One of the few bright spots was pitcher Brad Radke's breakout season, in which he won 20 games, at one point had 12 consecutive victories, tying a record Scott Erickson set in 1991.  The team finished with a 68–94 record, good enough for fourth place in what proved to be the league's weakest division that season.  The Cleveland Indians, who won the division that year, made it all the way to the World Series, but lost in seven games to the Florida Marlins.

Offseason
November 4: Signed Juan Rincón as an amateur free agent.
December 5: Signed catcher and Minnesota native Terry Steinbach as a free agent.
December 12: Signed pitcher Bob Tewksbury as a free agent.
December 18: Signed pitcher Greg Swindell as a free agent.

Offense

In 1996, catcher Terry Steinbach had a 35-home run, 100-RBI season with the Oakland Athletics in a contract year.  Unfortunately for the Twins, he followed it up with a 12-home run, 54-RBI season with his hometown team.  Scott Stahoviak played in half the games at first base but batted only .229.  Second baseman Chuck Knoblauch, the team's lone all-star, had a great year with the Twins, batting .291 and stealing a career-high 62 bases; he won his second Silver Slugger Award.  The contrast between his season and his team's season led him to demand a trade, a demand the team obliged by sending him to the New York Yankees the following February.  Ron Coomer had a competent year at third, with 13 home runs. He declined to "ride the pines" to protect a .301 batting average, and finished 1 for his last 8 to end at .298. Pat Meares hit .276, an above-average season for him.  The primary outfielders – Marty Cordova, Rich Becker, and Matt Lawton – had mediocre seasons.  This was disappointing, because Cordova and Becker were coming off of the best years in their careers.  Designated hitter Paul Molitor had a good year, batting .305 with 89 RBI, but it did not match his stellar 1996 numbers.  Veterans like Roberto Kelly and Greg Colbrunn performed reasonably well off the bench.

Pitching

Brad Radke had a breakout year, going 20–10 with an ERA of 3.87.  His string of twelve consecutive wins in twelve consecutive starts had only been matched twice since 1950. Bob Tewksbury and Rich Robertson spent most of the year in the starting rotation, but both had losing records.  In the final two spots, LaTroy Hawkins, Scott Aldred, and Frank Rodriguez respectively had 20, 15, and 15 starts.  Of these three, Rodriguez was the only one with an ERA under 5.  Rick Aguilera had a good year as the team's closer, earning 26 saves in not very many opportunities.  Eddie Guardado, Mike Trombley, Greg Swindell, and Todd Ritchie had competent seasons in the bullpen.  At the end of the season, Dan Serafini played well in six games, giving some hope for the future.

Defense

Steinbach played well at catcher, backed up by Greg Myers.  Stahoviak played in 81 games at first, with Colbrunn in 64.  Knoblauch won a Gold Glove at second base in a season that gave no indication of his future throwing problems.  Coomer (third base) and Meares (shortstop) were average at their positions.  The three outfielders played well in the field.

Regular season

Season standings

Record vs. opponents

Roster

Notable transactions

January 24: Signed first baseman Greg Colbrunn as a free agent.
June 3: Drafted future major leaguers Michael Cuddyer (1st round, 9th pick), Matthew LeCroy (1st, 50th), Michael Restovich (2nd round), J. C. Romero (21st round), and Nick Punto (33rd round).  (Punto did not sign with the team.)
July 31: Relief pitcher Dave Stevens claimed off waivers from the Chicago Cubs.
August 14: Traded Colbrunn to the Atlanta Braves for a player to be named later.  On October 1, the Braves sent the Twins minor leaguer Mark Lewis to complete the deal.
August 20: Traded Roberto Kelly to the Seattle Mariners for players to be named later.  On October 9, the Mariners sent the Twins Joe Mays and minor leaguer Jeromy Palki to complete the deal.
November 18: Catcher Damian Miller and outfielder/first baseman Brent Brede lost to the Arizona Diamondbacks in the expansion draft.
December 11: Signed outfielder Otis Nixon as a free agent.
December 12: Traded outfielder Rich Becker to the New York Mets for outfielder Alex Ochoa.
December 16: Signed pitcher Mike Morgan as a free agent.
December 23: Signed infielder and Minnesota native Brent Gates as a free agent.
December 24: Signed pitcher Mike Nakamura as a free agent.

Player stats

Batting

Starters by position
Note: Pos = Position; G = Games played; AB = At bats; H = Hits; Avg. = Batting average; HR = Home runs; RBI = Runs batted in

Other batters
Note: G = Games played; AB = At bats; H = Hits; Avg. = Batting average; HR = Home runs; RBI = Runs batted in

Pitching

Starting pitchers
Note: G = Games pitched; IP = Innings pitched; W = Wins; L = Losses; ERA = Earned run average; SO = Strikeouts

Other pitchers
Note: G = Games pitched; IP = Innings pitched; W = Wins; L = Losses; ERA = Earned run average; SO = Strikeouts

Relief pitchers
Note: G = Games pitched; W = Wins; L = Losses; SV = Saves; ERA = Earned run average; SO = Strikeouts

Miscellaneous
The highest paid Twin in 1997 was Knoblauch at $6,150,000, followed by Molitor at $3,500,000.
In recognition of the 50th anniversary of Jackie Robinson breaking MLB's color-line, the Twins wore uniforms of the 1909 St. Paul Colored Gophers at home against Cleveland on July 13, 1997.

Other post-season awards
Calvin R. Griffith Award (Most Valuable Twin) – Brad Radke
Joseph W. Haynes Award (Twins Pitcher of the Year) – Brad Radke
Bill Boni Award (Twins Outstanding Rookie) – none
Charles O. Johnson Award (Most Improved Twin) – Brad Radke
Dick Siebert Award (Upper Midwest Player of the Year) – Denny Neagle
The above awards are voted on by the Twin Cities chapter of the BBWAA
Carl R. Pohlad Award (Outstanding Community Service) – Rick Aguilera
Sherry Robertson Award (Twins Outstanding Farm System Player) – David Ortiz

All-Star Game: The lone representative of the Twins in the All-Star Game was second baseman Chuck Knoblauch.  Knoblauch also won the Gold Glove Award and Silver Slugger Award.

Paul Molitor won the Lou Gehrig Award, given annually to a Major League Baseball (MLB) player who best exhibits the character and integrity of Lou Gehrig, both on the field and off.

Farm system

References

External links
Player stats from www.baseball-reference.com
Team info from www.baseball-almanac.com
Twins history through the 1990s, from www.mlb.com
1997 Standings

Minnesota Twins seasons
Minnesota Twins
Twins